Jokgu (namely Korean-style footvolley) is a sport which combines aspects of association football and volleyball.

History
Jokgu was invented by members of the Republic of Korea Air Force in 1960 as a way to promote exercise on military bases. Jokgu is very popular in Korea, with over one thousand teams in professional, school, & military leagues. It is also one of the most common ways to pass time in the military. Jokgu is just one of the many sports that were premiered at the 1st Annual Leisure Games in Chuncheon, Korea in 2010. As interest in Jokgu has grown in America, teams joined together in 2011 to form a Jokgu league and a door to the world stage was opened.

Rule
It can be described as a fusion of volleyball and soccer. The rules are similar to volleyball, but only your feet, shin, & head may have contact with the ball. Teams are made up of four people on each side of the net and the height of the net is similar to tennis (1.1-meter). Players are allowed three contacts per side with one bounce in-between contacts. The playing area measures 16 x 7 meters. Each of two teams has four starting players and three relievers. A game consists of three sets of 15 points each. Score is counted under the rally point system, under which one must have a two-point advantage to win a game. The ball for jokgu measures 20 centimeters in diameter and weighs 360 grams.

See also 
 Football tennis
 Footvolley
 Sepak takraw

References

External links
Korea Jokgu Association
National Jokgu Association

Association football variants
Volleyball variations
Sports originating in South Korea
Ball games
Team sports
Hybrid sports